John Kean (June 4, 1820 – May 31, 1892) was an Irish-Canadian businessman and political figure. He represented Simcoe East in the Legislative Assembly of Ontario as a Conservative from 1875 to 1879.

He was born in Bushmills, County Antrim, Ireland in 1820 and, in 1832, came to Halton County in Upper Canada, where his parents had settled in 1824. He settled at Brantford, where he worked as a millwright, building sawmills and gristmills in the region. In 1850, he married Mary Jordan and the couple moved to Orillia in 1852. Kean served as reeve for the townships of Orillia and Matchedash from 1862 to 1869 and was warden of Simcoe County in 1868. In 1869, with partners, he built a large sawmill at the outlet of the Hogg River at Victoria Harbour.

In 1880, he was sent by the Canadian government to the Fort Macleod area of the North-West Territories (NWT), where he built a number of sawmills, including one on Pincher Creek. He later worked for the Canadian Pacific Railway. In 1883, Kean settled at Lethbridge, NWT, where he built a lumber mill and operated a number of businesses. He died there in 1892.

External links

[http://www.canadiana.org/ECO/mtq?doc=32953 The Canadian parliamentary companion, 1879 CH Mackintosh
A History of Simcoe County, AF Hunter (1909)
Pioneer Families of Southern Alberta

1820 births
1892 deaths
Progressive Conservative Party of Ontario MPPs
Irish emigrants to pre-Confederation Ontario
People from County Antrim
People from the Regional Municipality of Halton
People from Orillia
Immigrants to Upper Canada
Pre-Confederation Alberta people